The Korea Women's Open is a women's professional golf tournament in South Korea, sanctioned by the LPGA of Korea Tour.

The tournament debuted in 1987 and is the nation's national championship.

Winners

Source:

References

External links
Coverage on KLPGA official site

LPGA of Korea Tour events
Golf tournaments in South Korea
Summer events in South Korea
Recurring sporting events established in 1987
1987 establishments in South Korea